Söderhamns UIF is a sports club in Söderhamn, Sweden. Established in 1960, the club won the Swedish national men's table tennis team championship in 1978, 1982, 1985, 2001 and 2010.

References

External links
Official website 

1960 establishments in Sweden
Sport in Söderhamn
Sports clubs established in 1960
Table tennis clubs in Sweden